Grzegorz Guzik (born 20 August 1991, in Sucha Beskidzka) is a Polish biathlete. He competed at the Biathlon World Championships 2013 in Nove Mesto na Morave. He competed at the 2014 Winter Olympics in Sochi, in sprint and individual.

In July 2014, Guzik married fellow biathlete Krystyna Pałka.

Biathlon results
All results are sourced from the International Biathlon Union.

Olympic Games
0 medals

*The mixed relay was added as an event in 2014.

World Championships
0 medals

*During Olympic seasons competitions are only held for those events not included in the Olympic program.
**The mixed relay was added as an event in 2005.

References 

1991 births
Living people
Polish male biathletes
Biathletes at the 2014 Winter Olympics
Biathletes at the 2018 Winter Olympics
Biathletes at the 2022 Winter Olympics
Olympic biathletes of Poland
People from Sucha County